Ben Numbi (born 22 March 2000) is a Congolese footballer who lasted played for Tacoma Defiance in the USL Championship on loan from MFK Vyškov.

References

External links
USL bio

2000 births
Living people
Democratic Republic of the Congo footballers
Democratic Republic of the Congo expatriate footballers
Tacoma Defiance players
Association football midfielders
USL Championship players
21st-century Democratic Republic of the Congo people